Statistics of the Scottish Football League in season 1912–13.

Scottish League Division One

Scottish League Division Two

See also
1912–13 in Scottish football

References

 
1912-13